Andres Varik (born on 7 April 1952 in Põlva) 1997-1999 he was Minister of Rural Affairs. is an Estonian politician and agronomist. He has been a member of VIII and IX Riigikogu. 1997-1999 he was Minister of Rural Affairs.

He was a member of Estonian Country People's Party.

References

Living people
1952 births
Estonian agronomists
People's Union of Estonia politicians
Members of the Riigikogu, 1995–1999
Members of the Riigikogu, 1999–2003
Agriculture ministers of Estonia
Estonian University of Life Sciences alumni
People from Põlva